Talana is a town and comune in the province of Nuoro, Sardinia, Italy. The town is located above a valley, at an elevation of almost . The area has been occupied since the Bronze Age, with many nuraghes nearby. It was part of the Giudicato of Cagliari in medieval times. There is a hotel and several bed and breakfasts in the town.

References